Milan Čič (2 January 1932 – 9 November 2012) was a Slovak lawyer and politician who served as the prime minister of the Slovak Socialist Republic from 1989 to 1990.

Čič entered politics in 1961 as a member of the Communist Party of Czechoslovakia (leaving the party in 1990).

In 1993, he was appointed a judge of the Constitutional Court of the Slovak Republic, and shortly thereafter was appointed President of the Court. Čič had formally been a professor of law at Comenius University in Bratislava.

See also 
 List of prime ministers of the Slovak Socialist Republic

References 

|-

1932 births
2012 deaths
People from Námestovo District
Communist Party of Czechoslovakia politicians
Public Against Violence politicians
People's Party – Movement for a Democratic Slovakia politicians
Prime Ministers of Slovakia
Slovak communists
Slovak judges
Academic staff of Comenius University
Czechoslovak lawyers